"Casual Encounter" is a song by Australian rock band Divinyls, released in August 1983. The song originally appeared on the Australian release of the band's debut album Desperate, but first appeared on the international release of their second album What a Life!. "Casual Encounter" did not meet with success when it was released as a single, only peaking at number ninety-one on the Australian Kent Music Report singles chart.

On the original Australian version of Desperate, "Casual Encounter" ran 3:17 and had a proper ending, but the single and What a Life versions just faded it out at the 3:05 mark, which was carried over to Greatest Hits in 2006.

Track listing
Australian 7" Single
 "Casual Encounter" - 3:05
 "Gonna Get You" (Re-recorded)
 "Only Lonely" (Live)

Charts

References

1983 singles
Divinyls songs
Songs written by Chrissy Amphlett
Songs written by Mark McEntee
1983 songs
Chrysalis Records singles
Song recordings produced by Mark Opitz